Red Boys Differdange is a Luxembourgian handball team.

European record

External links
Official website

Differdange